The R329 road is a regional road in east central County Mayo in Ireland.

The government legislation that defines the R329, the Roads Act 1993 (Classification of Regional Roads) Order 2012 (Statutory Instrument 54 of 2012), provides the following official description:

R329: Knock, County Mayo (Part Old National Route 17)

Between its junction with N17 at Shanvaghera and its junction with N17 at Ballyfarnagh via Knock all in the county of Mayo.

See also
List of roads of County Mayo
National primary road
National secondary road
Regional road
Roads in Ireland

References

Regional roads in the Republic of Ireland
Roads in County Mayo